Theodros Mitiku (Amharic: ቴዎድሮስ ምትኩ; died 22 December 2013), also known as Teddy Mitiku, was an Ethiopian musician and saxophonist who was the brother of renowned Ethiopian musician Teshome Mitiku, and a member of Souk Ekos Band, which operated in 1960s. He had worked with numerous bands and artists in 1960s and 1970s musical era, including Ibex Band, Menelik Band, Mahmoud Ahmed, Tilahun Gessesse and Mulatu Astatke. He mostly worked with Ambassel Records while AIT Records was a secondary record label.

Career
Theodros Mitiku was the brother of renowned Ethiopian saxophonist Teshome Mitiku and a member of Soul Ekos Band, the first independent musical ensemble recorded in Ethiopia, as well as Ibex and Menelik Bands. He also supported other bands of 1960s and 1970s of music era and artists such as Tilahun Gessesse, and Mulatu Astatke. In Ibex Band, he was half of the group 's two-saxophone horn section on the Mahmoud Ahmed hit "Era Mela Mela". Since then, he collaborated with his brother Teshome, performing with solo albums and performances to entertain audiences.

Death
Theodros died from medical treatment on 22 December 2013 and his funeral service was held at Debre Kidist Mariam Church in Washington D.C. He was laid to rest at Gate of Heaven Cemetery in Silver Spring, Maryland, on 28 December. At the time of his death, he was survived by his wife of 22 years, Meaza Bezu, a daughter, Makeda, his brother Teshome and his sister Kedist.

Discography

References

2013 deaths
Ethiopian musicians